Gymnoscelis fragilis is a moth in the family Geometridae. It is found on New Guinea.

References

Moths described in 1900
Gymnoscelis